Mlado Nagoričane is the largest village in the municipality of Staro Nagoričane, North Macedonia.

Demographics
According to the 2002 census, the village had a total of 1,292 inhabitants. Ethnic groups in the village include:

Macedonians 1,273
Serbs 17
Albanians 1
Others 1

Notable people
Timotej of Debar and Kichevo

References

Villages in Staro Nagoričane Municipality